Marsha J. Pechman (born 1951) is a senior United States district judge of the United States District Court for the Western District of Washington.

Education and career

Born in Salem, Oregon, Pechman received a Bachelor of Arts degree from Cornell University in 1973 and a Juris Doctor from Boston University School of Law in 1976. She was a legal intern, King County Prosecutor's Office in 1976. She was a deputy prosecutor, King County Prosecuting Attorney's Office from 1976 to 1979. She was an instructor/staff attorney of University of Washington School of Law from 1979 to 1981. She was in private practice in Seattle from 1981 to 1988. She was an Adjunct professor, University of Puget Sound from 1983 to 1987. She was a judge on the King County Superior Court, Washington, from 1988 to 1999.

Federal judicial service

On March 24, 1999, Pechman was nominated by President Bill Clinton to a seat on the United States District Court for the Western District of Washington vacated by William L. Dwyer. She was confirmed by the United States Senate on September 8, 1999, and received her commission on September 9, 1999.  On September 1, 2011, she became Chief Judge, succeeding Judge Robert S. Lasnik. She assumed senior status on February 6, 2016.

Notable case

Pechman is most well known for presiding over the 2008 trial between the City of Seattle and the owners of the Seattle SuperSonics.

Pechman sat on the Karnoski v. Trump case for over three years without issuing a decision. Joe Biden eventually repealed the Trump trans soldier ban.

Personal

Pechman has two daughters.

Sources

1951 births
Living people
Boston University School of Law alumni
Cornell University alumni
Judges of the United States District Court for the Western District of Washington
Politicians from Salem, Oregon
Superior court judges in the United States
United States district court judges appointed by Bill Clinton
Lawyers from Salem, Oregon
Lawyers from Seattle
Washington (state) state court judges
20th-century American judges
21st-century American judges
20th-century American women judges
21st-century American women judges